Freddy Rodríguez (December 1, 1945 – October 10, 2022) was an American artist born in the Dominican Republic, who lived and worked in New York  since 1963. Much of his work takes the form of large hard-edge geometric abstractions. His paintings have been widely exhibited and are held in several important collections.

Early life
Freddy Rodríguez was born in Santiago de los Caballeros in the Dominican Republic in 1945. He comes from a family of Dominican artists including Yoryi Morel. 

In 1963, Rodríguez immigrated to the United States for political reasons, during the period after the Rafael Trujillo assassination in 1961. In New York, he often visited the Metropolitan Museum of Art, where he was particularly inspired by the work of El Greco, Rembrandt, Goya, and Van Gogh. At the Museum of Modern Art he preferred Pablo Picasso, Paul Cézanne and Piet Mondrian. 

He studied painting at the Art Students League of New York under Sidney Dickinson; and at The New School with John Dobbs and Carmen Cicero. He also studied textile design at the Fashion Institute of Technology.

Career
In the 1980s, he joined several other visual artists including Bismark Victoria, Eligio Reynoso, Magno Laracuente and Tito Canepa to form "Dominican Visual Artists of New York." This group was successful in obtaining sponsorship for exhibitions of Dominican Art in popular locations. In 1991, the New York Foundation for the Arts named him "Gregory Millard Fellow in Painting." In 1992, he was an NYSCA Artist in Residence at El Museo del Barrio.

Rodríguez's artistic practice was influenced by Rembrandt, Paul Cézanne and Piet Mondrian. His style incorporates elements of Abstract Expressionism, Pop and Minimalism. In 2011 the Smithsonian American Art Museum acquired three of his early works, painted in the early 1970s.  Tall and narrow, the abstract paintings named Danza Africana, Amor Africano, and Danza de Carnaval represent the energy of Dominican music through vibrant colors and zigzagging lines. A reviewer has discussed the political messages in his work, mourning the impact of colonialism and subsequent dictatorships on the original Caribbean paradise, saying, "The political messages are subsumed by the artist's desire to create beautiful paintings fusing Renaissance and modern traditions.  Integrating illusionistic space with flattened surfaces, and contrasting loose and tight brushstrokes, the artist enters a dialogue with centuries of art concerned with these same pictorial issues."

Exhibitions
Rodríguez has exhibited widely in museums, galleries, biennials, and art fairs. In 1994, Rodríguez's work was shown as part of the American contingent at the IV Bienal Internacional de Pintura en Cuenca, Ecuador. Other American artists exhibiting at this show were Donald Locke, Philemona Williamson, Whitfield Lovell and Emilio Cruz.

Selected solo exhibitions
 1974: Freddy Rodríguez. Museo del Hombre Dominicano, Santo Domingo, Dominican Republic
 1975: 2da Exposición Individual: Freddy Rodríguez. Casa de Teatro, Santo Domingo, Dominican Republic
 1976: Mil imágenes Plus.... Casa de Teatro, Santo Domingo, Dominican Republic
 1978: Freddy Rodríguez. Cayman Gallery, New York
 1980: Freddy Rodriguez: El Retorno. Casa de Teatro, Santo Domingo, Dominican Republic
 1982: Freddy Rodríguez. Cayman Gallery, New York
 1983: Corazón, Magia y Terruño. Voluntariado de las Casas Reales. Santo Domingo, Dominican Republic
 1986: El Paraíso: Desde el Descubrimiento Hasta la Colonizacion: Cimarrones y Otras Cosas. Boynayel Galería de Arte. Santo Domingo, Dominican Republic
 1989: Paraíso/Paraíso. Virginia Miller Galleries, Coral Gables, Florida
 1990: Queens 1990. Queens Museum of Art, Flushing, New York
 1990: Paradise. Scott Alan Gallery, New York
 1992: Terra Nostra. Fredric Snitzer Gallery, Coral Gables, Florida
 1993: Vienen Por Las Islas (1493) / They Come for the Islands (1493). Aljira, A Center for Contemporary Art, Newark, New Jersey
 1996: Priest: The Spirit and the Flesh. Jersey City Museum, Jersey City, New Jersey
 1999: En esta Casa Trujillo es el Jefe. Jersey City Museum, Jersey City, New Jersey
 2005: America’s Pastime: Portraits of the Dominican Dream, Works by Freddy Rodríguez, Newark Museum, Newark, New Jersey
 2009: Portrait of the Artist as an Immigrant/Portrait of an Immigrant as an Artist. Gabon Foundation, New York
 2013: Impredecible/Unpredictable. Instituto Cervantes, Tokyo, Japan
 2015: Freddy Rodríguez: My Geometries 1970–2002.  Longwood Art Gallery, Hostos Center for the Arts and Culture, Bronx, New York
2019: La Fiebre del Oro, Museo Ralli Santiago, Santiago, Chile
 2019: Freddy Rodríguez: Five Decades of Geometry. Diálogos. Isabella Hutchinson Modern. Frieze Art Fair, New York
 2020: Freddy Rodríguez: Early Paintings, 1970–1990. Hutchinson Modern and Contemporary, New York

Selected group exhibitions
 1971: New Images-West Side. Goddard-Riverside Community Center, New York
 1972: Contemporary Latin American Painters. Loeb Student Center, New York University, New York
 1973: Contemporary Reflections: Aldrich Museum of Contemporary Art, Ridgefield, Connecticut
 1974: XIII Bienal de Artes Plásticas. Santo Domingo, Dominican Republic
 1982: Sacred Artifacts, Objects of Devotion. Alternative Museum, New York
 1983: 13-Uptown. Noel Fine Art, Bronxville, New York
 1983: Queens Artist. Ollantay Gallery, Jackson Heights, New York
 1983: Works on Paper: Second Annual Juried Exhibition. Queenborough Community College, Bayside, New York
1984: Mira! The Canadian Club Hispanic Art Tour. El Museo del Barrio, New York; San Antonio Museum of Art, San Antonio, Texas; Plaza de la Raza, Los Angeles, California.
1984: Dominican Visual Artists of New York. City Gallery, New York
1984: Hispanic Artists in New York. Macy Gallery, Teachers College, Columbia University, New York
1984: Third Latin American Graphic Art Biennial. Cayman Gallery, New York
1984: Latin American Art. Montclair State College, Upper Montclair, New Jersey
1985: Spotlight on New Abstractions. Shippe Gallery, New York, New York
1985: Caribbean Art: African Currents, Twenty-First Annual Art Show, Goodard-Riverside Community Center, New York, New York
1986: Caribbean Art/African Currents, Museum of Contemporary Hispanic Art, New York, New York
1986: Regional: A Hispanic Invitational Art Exhibition. The Arthur Ross Gallery, University of Pennsylvania, Philadelphia, Pennsylvania
1988: Art from the African Diaspora
1991: Art Miami 91. Miami Beach Convention Center, Miami Beach, Florida
1991: Il Sud Del Mondo: L’Altra Arte Contemporanea. Galleria Civica D’Arte Contemporanea, Marsala, Sicily, Italy
1993: Current Identities: Recent Painting in the United States. Museum of Contemporary Art, Panama City, Panama
1994: Paper Visions V: A Biennial Exhibition of Works on Paper by Contemporary Latin American Artists. Housatonic Museum of Art, Bridgeport, Connecticut
1991: Awakening. Discovery Museum, Bridgeport, Connecticut
1994: IV Bienal de Pintura, Cuenca, Ecuador; and Cucalón Gallery, New York, New York
1996: Modern and Contemporary Art of the Dominican Republic. Americas Society, New York, New York; and Bass Museum, Miami, Florida
1997: Art in Transit; A Dominican Experience. INTAR Latin American Gallery, New York
1997: Talk Back! The Community Responds to the Permanent Collection, Part II. The Bronx Museum of the Arts, Bronx, New York
1998: Three Caribbean Artists. James Howe Fine Arts Gallery, Kean University, Union, New Jersey
1998: New York State Biennial. New York State Museum, Albany, New York
2001: The Political is the Personal:  Perspectives from the Latin American Diaspora. The College Art Gallery, The College of New Jersey, Ewing, New Jersey
2003: L Factor. Exit Art, New York
2005: My Island, My Home/ Mi Isla Mi Hogar. The Long Island Museum, Stony Brook, New York
2006: Merengue! Visual Rhythms/Ritmos Visuales. El Museo del Barrio, New York
2006: This Skin I'm In: Contemporary Dominican Art from El Museo del Barrio's Permanent Collection. El Museo del Barrio, New York
2007: Cardinal Points/Puntos Cardinales: A Survey of Contemporary Latin and Latin American Art from the Sprint Nextel Art Collection. Art Museum of South Texas, Corpus Christie, Texas 
2007: Sugar Buzz. Lehman Collage Art Gallery, Bronx, New York 
2007: The Players. The Arsenal Gallery in Central Park, New York, New York 
2007: Upon Further Review: Looking at Sports in Contemporary Art. Rockland Center for the Arts, West Nyack, New York 
2008: Nos vemos en el play!...Béisbol y Cultura Dominicana. Centro León, Santiago, Dominican Republic
2009: Voces y Visiones: Four Decades through El Museo del Barrio's Permanent Collection, El Museo del Barrio, New York, New York
2010: Duodecad = 12. Edge Zones Art Center, Miami, Florida
2011: Colorforms. Praxis Gallery, Miami, Florida
2011: Interstices and Emphasis. Aljira, A Center for Contemporary Art, Newark, New Jersey
2012: Creating A Living Legacy. CUE Art Foundation, Presented by Joan Mitchell Foundation. Diálogo 365. City Hall, Philadelphia, Pennsylvania
2013: Our America: The Latino Presence in American Art. Smithsonian American Art Museum, Washington, DC
2014: Caribbean Art at the Crossroads of the World. Perez Art Museum, Miami, Florida
2014: Flow: Economies of the Look and Creativity in Contemporary Art of the Caribbean. Inter-American Development Bank Headquarters, Washington DC
2014: If You Build It. Sugar Hill, New York, New York
2015: Thinking in Spanish. The Puffin Foundation, Teaneck, New Jersey
2016: Tyranny’s Tear: Mending a Dominican Trauma. BronxArtSpace, Bronx, New York
2016: Resilience: Reclaiming History and the Dominican Diaspora, Inter-American Development Bank, Washington, DC
2016: Fifth Bronx Latin American Art Biennial. Longwood Art Gallery, Bronx, New York
2016: The Illusive Eye, El Museo del Barrio, New York, New York
2018: Bordering the Imaginary: Art from the Dominican Republic, Haiti, and Their Diasporas. BRIC, Brooklyn, New York
2018: Recent Acquisitions. National Portrait Gallery, Washington, DC
2018: The Sidewalk of the Americas. Inter-American Development Bank Annual Meeting, Mendoza, Argentina
2018: Revival: Pattern and Decoration. Longwood Art Gallery, Bronx, New York
2019: Culture and the People: El Museo del Barrio 1969-2019, El Museo del Barrio, New York, New York
2021: Latinx Abstract. BRIC, Brooklyn, New York
2022: American Stories: Gifts from the Jersey City Museum Collection, Zimmerli Art Museum, New Bruswick, New Jersey
2022: In The Balance, Whitney Museum of American Art, New York, New York

Selected Permanent Collections 
Whitney Museum of American Art, New York
Smithsonian American Art Museum, Washington, DC
National Portrait Gallery, Washington, DC
El Museo del Barrio, New York
Bronx Museum of Art, New York
Queens Museum of Art, New York
Newark Museum, Newark, NJ
Museo de las Casas Reales, Santo Domingo, Dominican Republic
National Gallery of Art, Washington, DC

References
Citations

Further reading
 Anreus, Alejandro. Ed. Freddy Rodriguez: In this house, Trujillo is chief! = En esta casa Trujillo es el jefe. Exh cat. Jersey City, NJ: Jersey City Museum of Art, 1999.
 Cullen, Deborah and Elvis Fuentes. Eds. Caribbean: Art at the Crossroads of the World. Exh. cat. New York: El Museo del Barrio in association with Yale University Press, 2012.
 Dardashti, Abigail Lapin. "El Dorado: The Neobaroque in Dominican American Art." Diálogo, Vol. 20, No. 1 (Spring 2017): 73–87.
 Dardashti, Abigail Lapin, et al. Bordering the Imaginary: Art from the Dominican Republic, Haiti, and Their Diasporas. Exh. cat. Brooklyn, NY: BRIC, 2018.
 Hutchinson Modern & Contemporary. Freddy Rodríguez. Exh. cat. New York, NY: Hutchinson Modern & Contemporary, 2021. 
Lewthwaite, Stephanie. "Traumatic Memory in the Art of Freddy Rodríguez."  In Memory and Post Colonial Studies: Synergies and New Directions, edited by Dirk Göttsche. Oxford: Peter Lang, 2019. 
 Price, Mary Sue Sweeney, E. Carmen Ramos, and Richard Goodbody. America’s Pastime: Portrait of the Dominican Dream, Works by Freddy Rodríguez. Exh. cat. Newark, NJ: The Newark Museum, 2006.
 Ramos, E. Carmen and Tomas Ybarra-Frausto. Our America: The Latino Presence in American Art. Exh. cat. Washington DC: Smithsonian American Art Museum, 2013, pp. 170–173.

External links

Smithsonian American Art Museum
Our America, Audio Podcasts: Works by Freddy Rodriguez
Voices in Contemporary Art (VoCA): CALL/VoCA Talk: Freddy Rodríguez
Obituary by Alex Greenberger, ARTnews: https://www.artnews.com/art-news/news/freddy-rodriguez-artist-dead-1234643117/

1945 births
Living people
People from Santiago de los Caballeros
American artists
Dominican American visual artists